Checkmate is a 1931 German drama film directed by Georg Asagaroff and starring Gerda Maurus, Hans Rehmann, and Trude Berliner.

The film's sets were designed by the art director Alexander Ferenczy.

Cast

References

Bibliography

External links 
 

1931 films
1931 drama films
Films of the Weimar Republic
German drama films
1930s German-language films
Films directed by Georg Asagaroff
German black-and-white films
1930s German films